The Ministry of Employment and Labor announced on December 30 2021 that as of 2020, 14.2% of workers were in trade unions in South Korea, a 1.7% increase from 12.5% in 2019. Korea's unionization rate peaked in 1989 at 19.8% and fell to 10% 2004.  

There are two national trade union centres in South Korea: the Federation of Korean Trade Unions (FKTU) and the Korean Confederation of Trade Unions (KCTU).  In 2007, the FKTU had 1,153,863 members (41.1% of trade unionists in Korea), the KCTU had 1,134,056 members (40.4%), and 516,714 workers were members of independent trade unions affiliated to neither national centre.

See also
Women in unions in South Korea

References

 
Economy of South Korea